Sar Bast (also known as Barmowbūreh, Sar Bas-e Baram Būreh, and Sar Bast-e Baram Būreh) is a village in Kamfiruz-e Shomali Rural District, Kamfiruz District, Marvdasht County, Fars Province, Iran. At the 2006 census, its population was 467, in 105 families.

References 

Populated places in Marvdasht County